Cvijan Milošević (born 27 October 1963) is a Yugoslav retired  football player. He was capped once for the Yugoslav national team.

Club career
After being one of the main playmakers of FK Sloboda Tuzla for almost a decade in the Yugoslav First League, in January 1990 he moved to Belgium where he played for several clubs in the Belgian First Division, namely R.F.C. de Liège, Royal Antwerp FC, Germinal Ekeren and K.V.C. Westerlo. While at R.F.C. de Liège he helped them win the 1989–90 Belgian Cup. He won the Belgian Cup again with Germinal Ekeren in 1997.

International career
Milošević made his senior debut for Yugoslavia in an August 1988 friendly match away against Switzerland, coming on as a late substitute for Vladislav Đukić. It was played a month before the 1988 Summer Olympics in Seoul and remained his sole 'A' international appearance.

He later played in two games, both as a second-half substitute, at Olympic football tournament.

Personal life
His son Deni Milošević is a professional footballer who plays as an attacking midfielder for Süper Lig club Konyaspor and the Bosnia and Herzegovina national football team.

Honours
RFC Liège
 Belgian Cup: 1989–90

Germinal Ekeren
 Belgian Cup: 1996–97

References

External links

 Profile with career stats at Reprezentacija.rs.

1963 births
Living people
Sportspeople from Tuzla
Serbs of Bosnia and Herzegovina
Association football midfielders
Yugoslav footballers
Yugoslavia international footballers
Olympic footballers of Yugoslavia
Footballers at the 1988 Summer Olympics
Bosnia and Herzegovina footballers
FK Sloboda Tuzla players
RFC Liège players
Royal Antwerp F.C. players
Beerschot A.C. players
K.V.C. Westerlo players
Yugoslav First League players
Belgian Pro League players
Yugoslav expatriate footballers
Expatriate footballers in Belgium
Yugoslav expatriate sportspeople in Belgium
Bosnia and Herzegovina expatriate footballers
Bosnia and Herzegovina expatriate sportspeople in Belgium